The following is a list of presently operating intercity bus stops in Illinois with regular service. The list excludes charter buses, local transit buses, paratransit systems, and trolleybus systems. The following companies provide intercity bus service in Illinois as of September 2022:

 Amtrak Thruway
 Barons Bus Lines
 Burlington Trailways
 Flixbus
 Greyhound Lines
 Miller Transportation (Hoosier Ride)
 Peoria Charter Coach Company
 Tornado Bus Company
 Van Galder Bus Company
 Wisconsin Coach Lines

Stops
This is the list of 49 active intercity bus stops serving 33 cities in Illinois. This list does not include stops that are served only by commuter buses and not intercity buses. This list also does not include Tornado Bus Company stops, due to the difficulty of obtaining information on routes and stop locations.

Notes

The following intercity bus stops in Indiana, Iowa, and Wisconsin connect with local transit systems which operate in Illinois.

Former

See also 
 List of Amtrak stations
 List of intercity bus stops in Iowa
 List of intercity bus stops in Wisconsin

References

External links

Bus transportation in Illinois
Bus stations in Illinois
Transportation in Illinois